Amasa Emerson Killam (July 25, 1834 – August 20, 1922) was a political figure in New Brunswick, Canada. He represented Westmorland County in the Legislative Assembly of New Brunswick from 1879 to 1882 and from 1883 to 1899 as a Liberal-Conservative member.

He was born and educated in Dorchester, New Brunswick, of United Empire Loyalist descent. In 1857, he married Millicent Wheaton. He served as postmaster and was also manager for several railways. He was defeated in the 1882 general election but was elected in an 1883 by-election held after Pierre-Amand Landry was elected to the House of Commons.

References 
The Canadian parliamentary companion, 1889, JA Gemmill

1834 births
1922 deaths
Progressive Conservative Party of New Brunswick MLAs